Mirco Maestri (born 26 October 1991) is an Italian cyclist, who currently rides for UCI ProTeam . He was named in the start list for the 2016 Giro d'Italia.

Major results
2015
 2nd Trofeo Città di Brescia
 2nd Memorial Vincenzo Mantovani
 6th Giro del Medio Brenta
 7th Coppa Collecchio
2017
 1st  Mountains classification, Tour of Turkey
2018
 1st  Overall International Tour of Rhodes
1st  Points classification
1st Stage 4
2019
 1st  Points classification, Tirreno–Adriatico
 1st Stage 2 (ITT) Tour of China I
2021
 1st GP Slovenian Istria
 1st GP Slovenia

Grand Tour general classification results timeline

References

External links
 
 
 

1991 births
Living people
Italian male cyclists
People from Guastalla
Cyclists from Emilia-Romagna
Sportspeople from the Province of Reggio Emilia